Michael or Mike Thornton may refer to:

 Michael Thornton (Medal of Honor, awarded 1884) (1856–?), United States Navy sailor and Medal of Honor recipient
 Michael B. Thornton (born 1954), United States Tax Court judge
 Michael E. Thornton (born 1949), United States Navy SEAL and Vietnam War Medal of Honor recipient
 Michael Patrick Thornton, American actor and theater director
 Mike Thornton (politician) (born 1952), British Liberal Democrat politician and former MP

See also
Thornton (surname)